is a former Japanese football player.

Playing career
Fujikawa was born in Tokushima Prefecture on October 7, 1978. After graduating from high school, he joined J1 League club Kyoto Purple Sanga in 1997. However he could not play at all in the match. He left the club end of 1997 season and he entered Nippon Bunri University in 1998. In October 2000, he joined J2 League club Oita Trinita. In 2001, he moved to Sagan Tosu. On July 10, 2002, he debuted in J2 League against Ventforet Kofu. In 2003, he battled with Norio Takahashi and Junnosuke Schneider for the position and played many matches. However he could hardly play in the match in 2004. In 2005, he moved to Japan Football League club ALO'S Hokuriku (later Kataller Toyama). He played many matches as regular goalkeeper until 2007. However he could not play at all in the match behind Yuji Nakagawa from 2008 and retired end of 2009 season.

Club statistics

References

External links

1978 births
Living people
Nippon Bunri University alumni
Association football people from Tokushima Prefecture
Japanese footballers
J1 League players
J2 League players
Japan Football League players
Kyoto Sanga FC players
Oita Trinita players
Sagan Tosu players
Kataller Toyama players
Association football goalkeepers